Cyrtochilum falcipetalum is an epiphytic orchid native to Venezuela. Its most notable characteristic is its inflorescence which is a "scrambling, flexuous" panicle up to twenty feet (six meters) in length and consisting of up to ten  exquisitely sculpted three-inch, reddish-brown and yellow flowers.

References

Oncidiinae